Hannah Peak is a sharp peak at the southwest end of the Dufek Massif,  north-northeast of Walker Peak, in the Pensacola Mountains of Antarctica. It was mapped by the United States Geological Survey from surveys and U.S. Navy air photos from 1956 to 1966, and was named by the Advisory Committee on Antarctic Names for James L. Hannah, a construction electrician who wintered-over at Ellsworth Station in 1957 and McMurdo Station in 1961.

References

Mountains of Queen Elizabeth Land
Pensacola Mountains